Ken Knabb (born 1945) is an American writer, translator, and radical theorist, known for his translations of Guy Debord and the Situationist International.  His own English-language writings, many of which were anthologized in Public Secrets (1997), have been translated into over a dozen additional languages.  He is also a respected authority on the political significance of Kenneth Rexroth.

Early life
Knabb was born in Louisiana in 1945 and raised in Missouri. He attended Shimer College from 1961 to 1965, then moved to Berkeley, California, where he took part in the countercultural and radical adventures of the 1960s. In 1969, having become disillusioned with the increasingly authoritarian tendencies in the New Left movement, he became an anarchist. Later that same year, he discovered some pamphlets by the Situationist International and was so struck by them that he began experimenting with critiques and interventions in a style similar to that of the situationists. Over the next few years, he taught himself French in order to read the original situationist writings (most of which were then unavailable in English) and made several extended visits to France to meet various situationist groups and individuals, as well as shorter trips to meet contacts in other European countries and in Japan and Hong Kong.

Works
In 1981, Knabb published the Situationist International Anthology, a large collection of articles drawn mostly from the French journal Internationale Situationniste. His other translations include Guy Debord's film scripts (Complete Cinematic Works), Debord's The Society of the Spectacle, and Ngo Van's In the Crossfire: Adventures of a Vietnamese Revolutionary. Knabb's own writings include leaflets, comics, pamphlets and articles on Wilhelm Reich, Georges Brassens, Gary Snyder, the 1960s hip counterculture, the 1970 Polish revolt, the 1979 Iranian revolution, the 1991 Gulf war, the 2006 anti-CPE revolt in France, the 2011 Occupy movement, the 2016 Trump election, and the 2020 covid crisis. Longer works include The Relevance of Rexroth (a study of the anarchist poet and essayist Kenneth Rexroth), Gateway to the Vast Realms (a reader's guide to 500 recommended books), and The Joy of Revolution (an examination of the pros and cons of diverse radical tactics followed by some speculations on how a nonstate and noncapitalist postrevolutionary society might function).

Perspectives 
Although Knabb has remained in substantial agreement with most of the situationist perspectives, some of his writings can be seen as attempts to meld, or at least to juxtapose, those perspectives with the rather different tone and scope of Kenneth Rexroth and with the experiential insights of Zen Buddhism (he is a long-time Zen practitioner). In a 1977 pamphlet, for example, he critiqued what he saw as the situationists' blindspot regarding religion. Conversely, he has also criticized the political naiveté of "socially engaged" Buddhists. Another of his recurring themes is the importance of paying attention to the psychological or "subjective" aspect of radical activities.

Bibliography
The Relevance of Rexroth (1990)
Public Secrets: Collected Skirmishes of Ken Knabb (1997)
The Joy of Revolution (2017, by AK Press)
(trans.) Situationist International Anthology (1981; revised and expanded edition, 2006)
(trans.) Guy Debord’s Complete Cinematic Works (2003)
(trans.) Guy Debord's The Society of the Spectacle (2004; revised and annotated edition, 2014)
(trans.) Ngo Van's In the Crossfire: Adventures of a Vietnamese Revolutionary (2010)

References

External links
Bureau of Public Secrets
Bureau of Public Secrets Records at Tamiment Library and Robert F. Wagner Labor Archives at New York University Special Collections
Ken Knabb Papers. General Collection, Beinecke Rare Book and Manuscript Library, Yale University.

1945 births
Living people
Situationists
Shimer College alumni
Translators from French
Translators to English
American translators